Lonnie Pfundander Byarm (November 6, 1889 – May 6, 1955) was an American college football player and coach. He served as the head football coach at North Carolina A&T University from 1924 to 1929 and Johnson C. Smith University from 1931 to 1933, compiling a career college football 30–31–9.

Head coaching record

Football

References

External links
 

1889 births
1955 deaths
American men's basketball players
Johnson C. Smith Golden Bulls basketball coaches
Johnson C. Smith Golden Bulls football coaches
NC State Wolfpack football players
NC State Wolfpack men's basketball players
North Carolina A&T Aggies football coaches
People from Union County, North Carolina